"The Nutshell" is the fourth episode of the third series of the 1960s cult British spy-fi television series The Avengers, starring Patrick Macnee and Honor Blackman. It was first broadcast by ABC on 19 October 1963. The episode was directed by Raymond Menmuir.

Plot
Steed and Cathy investigate espionage by a pretty burglar in "The Nutshell", codename for a top-secret underground nuclear shelter. They are not telling each other everything, and somewhere a traitor lurks.

Cast
 Patrick Macnee as John Steed
 Honor Blackman as Cathy Gale 
 Bud Tingwell as Mick Venner
 John Cater as Disco 
 Patricia Haines as Laura 
 Christine Shaw as Susan Campbell
 Edina Ronay as Elin Strindberg 
 Ian Clark as Anderson 
 Ray Browne as Alex 
 Jan Conrad as Jason Avon 
 Edwin Brown as Military Policeman, Bill

References

External links

Episode overview on The Avengers Forever! website

The Avengers (season 3) episodes
1963 British television episodes